Luiz Rodolfo Landim Machado (born 24 March 1957) is a Brazilian sports director and petroleum engineer. He is the current president of Clube de Regatas do Flamengo, elected for the 2019–2021 term and reelected for the 2022–2024 term

Industrial career 
Landim graduated from engineering department of the Federal University of Rio de Janeiro (UFRJ) in 1979. In February 1980 he joined Petrobras. He remained at Petrobras for 26 years where he served, among other positions, as the Production Superintendent of the Northeast Region and General Superintendent of the North Region.

From 2003 to 2006, Landim was president of Petrobras Distribuidora. He was executive president of MMX (mining), OGX (oil and gas) and OSX (shipbuilding), all companies founded by serial entrepreneur Eike Batista, who Landim sued. Landim was also director of Cameron International Corporation. He was a managing partner of Maré Investimentos and president of Ouro Preto Oil and Gas.

Flamengo

2012 election 
Landim was vice-president of planning during club president Eduardo Bandeira de Melo's first term (2012-2014). Landim would have been vice-president if Wallim Vasconcelos's party had won the 2012 election.

2018 election 
For the 2018 Flamengo elections, Landim was the main opposition candidate and defeated Rodrigo Lomba, candidate from the incumbent party of Bandeira de Melo. Before officially taking office in January 2019, Landim announced the hiring of new football manager for the 2019 season Abel Braga on Twitter.

2019 tragedy 
In February 2019, a fire took place in Flamengo's youth apartments. 8 boys, aged 14 to 16, died trying to leave the place where they were sleeping. These young boys were part of Flamengo's youth team and were sleeping in Flamengo's property. After general public commotion, Mr Landim, as president of Flamengo, became famous in Brazil for not providing assistance to the families of these boys. In addition, he conducted an aggressive negotiation tactic to pay as little as possible for these families, denying the amount proposed by federal authorities, beginning an extensive legal battle and, then, settling with the families individually after more than 2 years after the accident occurred. Important to note that these families were all of low income and could not afford the legal battle that Mr Landim decided to do.

References 

1957 births
Living people
CR Flamengo
Brazilian sportspeople